The Last Enchantments is a novel by American author Charles Finch. It was published by St. Martin’s Press and released on January 28, 2014.

Plot
The Last Enchantments tells the story of American graduate student Will Baker, and his relationships with friends and paramours, during his time at the University of Oxford. The book follows them through a tumultuous academic year at the fictional Fleet College, which is based in equal parts on Lady Margaret Hall, Trinity College, Oxford, and Merton College.

Reception
In a starred review, Library Journal wrote "In prose that glides effortlessly from scene to scene, Finch captures the fleeting time in people's lives when their every decision, from career to lover, seems freighted with eternal consequence . . . A vividly evocative love letter to his alma mater, Finch's first contemporary novel . . . often reads less like fiction than as memoir, and will be enjoyed by readers of both."

Publishers Weekly wrote “the strength of Finch’s novel is its vivid portrayal of Oxford University in all its history, along with the school’s ancient and quirky traditions, and colorful student body and faculty.” 

Kirkus Reviews wrote “Finch brings each character to life with striking effectiveness as they struggle with issues of class, the political climate, academics and their futures.  A portrait of university life that’s contemplative and nostalgic.”

External links
Information from St. Martin’s Press about the novel
"Leaving Victorian England" (November 2013)
"Winning Over James Wood" (October 2013)

References

2014 American novels
Novels set in University of Oxford
St. Martin's Press books